James Gibbons (born 21 September 1993) is an English professional rugby union player who plays for Ealing Trailfinders.

On 20 May 2016, Gibbons signs his first professional contract with Ealing Trailfinders in the RFU Championship from the 2016-17 season. On 6 April 2018, Gibbons signed for Championship rivals Coventry prior to the 2018-19 season. He returned to Ealing for the 2020–21 season.

References

1993 births
Living people
Coventry R.F.C. players
Ealing Trailfinders Rugby Club players
English rugby union players
Gloucester Rugby players
Rugby union players from Burton upon Trent
Rugby union props